Chungju Choe clan is one of the Korean clans. Their Bon-gwan is in Chungju, North Chungcheong Province. According to the research held in 2000, the number of Chungju Choe clan’s member was 13466. Because Silla had a crop failure in 846, robbers was widespread throughout the country. In response to Emperor Wuzong of Tang’s order,  was dispatched to Silla as an armed commander. After that,  was appointed as general. Then,  was appointed as Yinqing Guanglu Daifu because made some achievements when he suppressed revolts. ’s descendant founded Chungju Choe clan and made Chungju their Bon-gwan.

See also 
 Korean clan names of foreign origin

References

External links 
 

Choe clans
Korean clan names of Chinese origin
Clans based in Chungju